Mouni Sadhu (17 August 189724 December 1971) was the pen name of Mieczyslaw Demetriusz Sudowski, a Polish-born author of spiritual, mystical, and esoteric subjects. He lived in Poland until World War II, and eventually settled in Australia where he became a naturalized citizen. His wrote about Western and Eastern spirituality firstly, and also occultism both Western and Eastern, including Hermeticism, and the Yoga tradition of India. His greatest personal influence was Ramana Maharshi. The name "Mouni Sadhu" means "silent monk" in Sanskrit.

His literary estate was left to the Australian Society of Authors, of which he was a member. The royalties that have accrued from the estate now provide for services to Australian authors.

Biographical details
Reliable information about Mouni Sadhu's early life is hampered by the fact that the author was often reluctant to speak about his background. Dr. M. Hafiz Syed expressed it clearly and concisely in his Foreword to 'In Days of Great Peace' saying of Mouni Sadhu, "As an earnest seeker he pursued several methods of God realization as taught by various schools of Yoga, occultism and mysticism and finally came to his supreme Master and Guru, Bhagavan Sri Ramana Maharshi who finding him well equipped with the necessary qualifications..., granted him His Grace, eradicated his ego-sense (as reported by the author himself) and finally helped and guided him to discover his own eternal and ever-abiding Self."

The pseudonym 'Mouni Sadhu' (Silent Monk), indicates the fact that Mouni Sadhu's books are about the practical teachings embodied therein and the purpose and message entrusted him, and on a number of occasions he indicates that he felt that it was his spiritual Master who was directing the authors pen, certainly as far as the spiritual message contained in his works. Also, different commentators have furnished conflicting accounts of his early life often based on alleged hearsay, both unsupported and unreferenced, whilst furnishing very little in the way of evidence.

Be that as it may, there is a certain amount of biographical information contained within his books that can be relied upon as being authentic and factual. We know, for example, that Mouni Sadhu studied Hermeticism exclusively between 1926 and 1933, based to a large degree on the lectures of G.O. Mebes, which were obtained 'from a Russian refugee who brought the book with him in 1919, when fleeing his country which had just fallen into Communist hands.'

Prior to that,  "At 25 years of age, Theosophy attracted my attention. Its smooth and logical theories pleased my reason, as did the impeccable style of Mrs. Besant and Mr. Leadbeatter. For some time I corresponded with both. Then the honesty and idealism of the firsts President of the T.S. -Col.Olcott- and the mysterious and powerful personality of Madame Blavatsky, could not be disregarded." .

In the chapter 'A Wish Fulfilled' of 'In Days of Great Peace', Mouni Sadhu looks back on his life as a young man; "Many years ago, under the sky of far-off country of Europe, in the third year of the terrible conflagration of the first World War, a young man in military uniform was sitting on the platform of a small railway station waiting for his train. It was to take him to the front line, where the fire of battle was then raging, a fire from which so many never returned.. Compelled by the storm of war to leave his family and his studies, he sat there brooding over the fate that awaited him in a few days. It was the beginning of Autumn, a season when the dark night skies are often cut by the fiery lines of 'falling stars', of meteors."

In 1935 Mouni Sadhu visited France. In Paris he visited the headquarters of the Association of Spiritual Friendships (Amities Spirituelles), founded by Paul Sédir. Mouni Sadhu's last book published in 1967 was in fact an English translation from the French of Paul Sédir's book Initiations. In the forward to that translation Mouni Sadhu mentions; "In the previously mentioned Chapter XXXIX, the mysterious places in North-Eastern France still testify to the events described in it. So obviously, the author knew of them from his own personal experience, which I could see for myself when I visited those places a few years before 1939. Sedir was by no means an imaginative fiction writer, who fed his readers on his own literary inventions. If we are prepared to accept this fact then his books take on a tremendous personal meaning for us,...."

In Mouni Sadhu's application for Australian citizenship, he states that he was born in Warsaw, Poland. In 1933, he married Catherine Gunt. She died six years later in September 1939, in Vilno, Poland during the Battle of Wilno (1939), a bomb-attack coinciding with the outbreak of World War Two. One can deduce with certainty that Mouni Sadhu was taken as a prisoner of War on 19 September in the Battle of Wilno (1939) and remained a prisoner of war in the USSR until November. From there he was transferred as a prisoner of war in Germany until 1945. He was released in 1945 and served with the US Army in France until November 1946.

In the chapter IX, 'My Path to Maharshi', of 'In Days of Great Peace' he claims during this time in Paris, he was given the book A Search in Secret India by Paul Brunton. He wrote: "Soon after my visit to France, family life, and later the Second World War, brought me a period of darkness. I forgot all my previous endeavours. Not earlier than spring of 1945 an elderly lady, with whom I sometimes spoke of Theosophy, lent me Paul Brunton's  A Search in Secret India. She literally forced me to take the book, for I was by no means eager to read it; but the last two chapters, where the author describes his visit to Maharshi, were decisive. At last I had found my true Master." From there began the process of putting the Teaching of the Maharshi into practice, specifically in the form of Vichara, the Self-enquiry, ( also called The Direct Path ) or Quest of the Self, (Overself in the Vedantic sense), and of beginning the process of preparation that enabled Mouni Sadhu to reach the ashram of the great Rishi in 1949. To help facilitate the practice of Vichara and meditation in general, Mouni Sadhu during this time in Paris, and being 'Catholic born and bred' visited the Saint Vincent de Paul Monastery (Headquarters at Rue Sèvres), the Prior there knowing of his interest in Maharshi.

Similarly, in the chapter, 'My Path to Maharshi' he explains,  "A friend in Paris, a Roman Catholic priest, a well-educated and elderly man with whom I sometimes corresponded, knew of my endeavours without in any way attempting to dissuade me from them. I wrote saying to him that I wanted to find a place in which to live for some months, where quiet meditation would be possible. He kindly recommended his own monastery. Anyone, he said, who is a Roman Catholic and feels a need for spiritual concentration can go there for a time, take part in the simple life of its inmates according to his own inner capacity. Intuitively I felt that this is what I was seeking.". He goes on to say,  "Another priest visited me and asked what books I would like to read. Very gently he suggested a study of The Imitation of Christ by Thomas a Kempis. He was immensely pleased when I told him that was the very book for which I would have asked."

We see that Mouni Sadhu highly appreciated 'The Imitation of Christ' and also the 'Vivekachudamani' ('Crest Jewel of Wisdom') of Sri Sanakaracharya (Adi Sankara) the classic treatise of Advaita Vedanta, both of which he quoted extensively in his first published booklet 'Quem Sou Eu' ('Who am I?') published in Curitiba, Brazil, in 1948. Both of these works he subsequently quotes in all of his books and particularly as themes for meditation. About this time Mouni Sadhu came in contact with the head of the Ramakrishna Mission in Paris, the eminent Swami Siddheshwarananda, whom the Ashram of Sri Maharshi recommended him to visit.

So between 1946 and 1948 he lived for two years in Brazil, before emigrating to Australia. We learn that during this time he forms or is part of an, 'Arunachala Group' there and that his booklet Quem Sou Eu is a Portuguese translation of notes typed by him. He arrived in Sydney, Australia on 17 September 1948 aboard the SS Bernhard and then proceeded to Melbourne, arriving on 1 September 1948. Mouni Sadhu settled in Melbourne the remainder of his life.  On the 7/5/1949 he left Australia to visit India, having received an invitation to stay some months at the Ashram of Sri Ramanasramam, founded around the contemporary spiritual Master, Ramana Maharshi (1879-1950). His experiences there are beautifully described in the first book of his Mystic Trilogy entitled 'In Days of Great Peace'. He returned to Australia arriving 23 September 1949. In 1953 Mouni Sadhu in his 'Application for Naturalization as an Australian Citizen' declares,"Since his return he has resided continuously in Melbourne and is employed as an Electrical mechanic by the Melbourne City Council". In the same document he states that his further occupation is that of "part-time writer."

Esoteric involvement
As a young man in Europe, from 1926 to 1933, Mouni Sadhu belonged to an order of Rosicrucian Hermetists and published a number of articles on Tarot Hermetic philosophy as well as spirituality. Some believe that Mouni Sadhu reverted from spirituality back to occultism and that he was 'obsessed with occultism' in his books. Anyone who has seriously studied his books in total would understand those assertions to be false in every way. One has to understand what Mouni Sadhu meant by occultism and also the underlying purpose behind his writing about occultism in his works. Perhaps the definition of occult as given in Wikipedia best describes Mouni Sadhus conception also:

'The occult (from the Latin word occultus "clandestine, hidden, secret") is "knowledge of the hidden". In common English usage, occult refers to "knowledge of the paranormal", as opposed to "knowledge of the measurable", usually referred to as science. The term is sometimes taken to mean knowledge that "is meant only for certain people" or that "must be kept hidden", but for most practicing occultists it is simply the study of a deeper spiritual reality that extends beyond pure reason and the physical sciences. The terms esoteric and arcane have very similar meanings, and the three terms are interchangeable'.

In chapter 3 of  Samadhi entitled, 'Occult Theories about the Higher Worlds' (indicating higher than purely physical) Mouni Sadhu says "But the title of this chapter is clear: it speaks about the theories which occultism offers, in order to explain phenomena which otherwise cannot be explained."

Mouni Sadhu indicates even more clearly his conception of both occultism and spirituality in the 'Foreword' to his book Ways to Self-Realization: A Modern Evaluation of Occultism and Spiritual Paths where he says "Occultism is neither a synonymous term nor a substitute for spirituality, and spiritual men do not necessarily come from the ranks of occultists. They are two different things. The first term, occultism, calls for the supremacy of the invisible to transcend the narrow framework of the physical manifestation of matter. But efforts of an occultist still revolve around his personal ( that is egoistic ) gains, even if they belong to planes of being more subtle than the physical. He still lives dies and reincarnates. The second term, spirituality, transcends this world of illusion, and for a spiritual man the pronoun I becomes identical with the consciousness of the Whole. There is no more birth nor death for the fully spiritualized being."

Mouni Sadhu often uses the term 'occult psychology' especially referring to aspects of the developing field of modern psychology since its inception and so on. He refers the reader to William James's book The Varieties of Religious Experience a number of times.

In Meditation: an Outline for Practical Study, he elucidates his view thus :

'You must clearly realize, that the popular (but how fallacious!) idea, propagated by certain pseudo-occult and pseudo-philosophic organizations:'  Anyone can meditate! is sheer nonsense. 
Can you swim the English Channel without the ability to swim? Can you use a car, even after using dozens of manuals about motor construction and driving, without spending several hours on practical lessons with an experienced tutor?
At the present time the terms 'occultism' and 'occult psychology', 'initiations', and so on, are fairly well known to most intellectuals. But there is a lot of chaff among what is supposed to be occult wheat. I wrote at length about this sad fact in Chapter XLIV of my Ways to Self-Realization. But for firm discrimination, even a brief rule will suffice: seek for COMMON SENSE throughout a book, and if you cannot find it reject the work, as then it is of no value to you or anyone else.
There exists an unfortunate disproportion between materialistic knowledge and that of practical psychology, which latter is simply another name for true occultism.'

In his preface to Concentration Mouni Sadhu introduces the reader to the works of Yogi Ramacharaka and Yoga, stating:

'More than half a century ago [Mouni Sadhu was writing in the mid to late 1950s] a gifted and experienced American- William Walker Atkinson, writing under the pen-name of Yogi Ramacharaka, published a series of very useful books on Eastern philosophy and Yoga, which were wisely and purposefully based on his 'Eclectic Method'. His main works are Hatha Yoga, Raja Yoga, Gnani Yoga, Fourteen Lessons in Yogi Philosophy and Oriental Occultism, and his 'final message' under the title of Philosophies and Religions of India. These are perhaps the best of their kind and are unique, filled with practical advice.' In Ways to Self-Realization Mouni Sadhu dedicates Part I of that book to the memory of William Walker Atkinson, the other Parts being dedicated to Sri Ramana Maharshi, Paul Sédir, Dr Brandler-Pracht, and Dr Gérard Encausse (Papus) respectively.

Mouni Sadhu's writing often touches on aspects of Indian philosophy and Greek philosophy, which at certain times and instances could be viewed as esoteric. One can gauge from his books as a whole the fact that Mouni Sadhu at the time of his writing and with regard to the first half of the twentieth century leading up that point, felt and indicated that what was formally known as occult, hidden or secret knowledge restricted to those initiated into particular systems or schools, was now open to the world at large. He saw and foresaw the dangers, misunderstandings and problems associated with this, and one can see too a rationale and a desire for clarity, wisdom, service and advice to pupils of his works in his writing about esoteric matters. Always he advises, supports and encourages those inspired toward true spirituality as being the highest and the ultimate aim. But at the same time he recognizes the fact that not all are immediately attracted to or able to follow a true and genuine spiritual path. Therefore, he realizes the value of preparatory ways that may lead toward this ultimately. Also he talks to those who may have found such occult ways sterile or a blind alley, and from his genuine and vast experience in this area, he talks to such, from experience and in terms that are clear and understandable.

In chapter IX of 'Concentration' Mouni Sadhu says, "Perhaps in no other subdivision of human knowledge does their reign such disorder or lack of a system, as in occult problems." In chapter XX of Ways to Self- Realization entitled 'Maha Yoga and Its Value for the World', Mouni Sadhu says 'The very multiplicity of expositions on Yoga and the various treatises written by different interpreters of the ONCE "Secret Wisdom" are the very best proof that in not one of them can be found the fulkness of Truth. Also, the highly complicated "teachings" of many contemporary Yogis is another doubtful point I wish to stress. In reference to this in the same chapter Mouni Sadhu goes on to say "the Direct Path, also called Maha Yoga, the Highest Yoga or Path of Self-Realization, as taught by the Maharishi." indicating that the term 'Maha Yoga' was being used to describe the teachings of Ramana Maharshi and was above any particular system of Yoga adding that, "Things that are often obstacles when dealing with various systems of Yoga are immaterial to the latest revelation of Truth, given to us by the Great Rishi in our own era. In describing the relevance of 'Maha Yoga' he continues, "It became evident in this time of innumerable sects, religions, and philosophic and occult systems that a synthesis was urgently needed that could explain the one basis of them all, and at the same time infinitely transcend them. Indian Yogi, Muslim haji, Christian devotee, religionless occultist, nameless seeker of God or Truth, farmer, minister, engineer, sailor, merchant, for one and all of these men a unifying message had to be created: one that did not deny their former creeds but gave them a common luminous ideal whose peak could not be transcended by any previous theories and conceptions. It had to be something common to each man, referring to the immortal core of his life, beyond all racial and social differences, his unique and real treasure. And the Maharshi did just this. He came to us in the midst of our twentieth-century materialism with its breath-taking discoveries and inventions. He did not condemn any of them. He was not a religious leader whose role is limited to a few generations of men, but all religious truths became clear and understandable in the light of his revelation.
He seldom spoke about God, pointing out that men should know themselves, who they are, before they can be in a position to realize the state of Infinite Being, the Absolute, which they call God."

Spirituality

In 1949, Mouni Sadhu spent several months at the ashram of Ramana Maharshi, (Sri Ramanasramam) in Tiruvannamalai situated at the foot of the sacred mountain Arunachala in South India, worshiped since ancient days as the physical manifestation of Siva. He had spent the years since 1946 earnestly pursuing the quest of the Self ( Overself ) as taught by the Maharshi. That coupled with the earlier years of his inner striving in pursuit of Truth and Realisation qualified him as one well prepared to sit at the feet of the Great Rishi whose life and teaching were those of a genuine spiritual Master decreed to humanity in this our modern world.  He describes his experiences beautifully in his book In Days of Great Peace. There Mouni describes how his contact with the Maharshi and his earnest striving for attainment caused him to attain nirvikalpa samadhi. In all of Mouni Sadhu's subsequent books, he paid tribute to Ramana Maharshi describing him as  "the last Great Rishis of India." 'the modern Great Rishi of India' etc.

Of his first widely published book In Days of Great Peace, Mouni Sadhu says of it in his 'Introduction to the First Edition'; "I have not tried to write down any of the 'teachings' of Maharshi, as they can be found in many books. My purpose is to record that which the latter do not yet contain, namely, the real experiences of an average man, who wanted to know for himself what the presence of a great Sage means and what its influence is. I had read so many descriptions by pupils who were clever in classifying the qualities and teachings of their Masters, that I should have known at least in theory, what may be expected in the presence of one of Them. But all theories, all acquired knowledge, falls into dust when one stands face to face with a perfect man."
In fact Mouni Sadhu was very careful, accurate, thorough and specific in his references in regard to the teachings of the Maharshi; "As well as the words of Sri Maharshi spoken in my presence, I have used quotations from the published teachings of the Sage, which were revised and acknowledged by him." All quotations and sources of Sri Maharshi's teaching given by Mouni Sadhu can be relied upon and proven to be completely accurate and authentic, despite false claims to the contrary.

The first three books widely published by Mouni Sadhu form part of what he calls his 'Mystic Trilogy'. Furthermore, in the foreword to his last book (not including Initiations which was a translation) Meditation: an Outline or Practical Study, in describing that works relationship to Concentration and Samadhi, he says: 
"....the present work is like a continuation of the two just mentioned, and I writing on the assumption, that its two forerunners are well known to you. It would be impossible to repeat in Meditation the material previously expounded in other books."

In a letter to Thomas Merton in 1967, humbly requesting him as a spiritual brother, to consider writing a foreword to a planned book of his to be published as Contemplation: an Outline for Practical Study one can see both the development of a continuous theme and the intrinsically practical nature of these works dealing with the deeper and inner aspects of spirituality. Thomas Merton was not in a position to accept such an offer and the book was not published. It was Mouni Sadhu's translation of Initiations that was to be his last published work.

A number of reviewers and sources who have not understood or appreciated the practical nature of Mouni Sadhu's works, have unjustly described him as self-promoting. The fact is that he was completely anonymous and some of the books are connected, like any practical manual on a specifically technical subject, and are linked to, and sometimes prerequisites for, particular areas of study or levels of development. For example, he says in Samadhi: the Superconsciousness of the Future; "I mentioned a 'new' type of consciousness, a wider and brighter one, in two former books, which form the first and second parts of my mystic trilogy, being respectively: In Days of Great Peace and Concentration. An extensive study of both these books is necessary before one can attempt to make a start with the present work, which is the culminating point for its two predecessors. In Days of Great Peace deals with the experiences leading to the enlargement of consciousness, while Concentration gives the necessary explanations and techniques for the first step, that is, domination of one's mind. This book speaks about the ultimate aim, the achievement of Superconsciousness-Samadhi, and the way to it"

So we begin to see that in the second book Concentration.an Outline for Practical Study, specific aspects of the spiritual Christian Tradition start to emerge, especially in the chapter IX The Western Tradition (Heart before Mind) were for example Mouni Sadhu explains,
"As the Eastern occult schools treat concentration as a means for achievement for the highest goal, so the mind takes precedence over the heart. But in the Western spiritual tradition this is reversed. The best exponents, apart from a few dissentients, fix attention first and foremost on the moral purification of man and his religious, devotional sense. I am not including here the numerous and usually short-lived occult societies and groups, most of which were and still are occupied with aims which have practically nothing in common with the great task of transformation and purification of the human mind. 
My interest has been directed to the places where men's inner work has always produced the greatest results. When I studied the lives of the first and later Christian saints of the Egyptian desert, the caves of Anatolia, the catacombs of Rome, and the monasteries of Kiev and Western Europe, I reached the firm conviction that Western adepts knew as much, if not more about the value of a one-pointed mind in spiritual achievement, than their Eastern brothers."

Mouni Sadhu speaks with deep admiration of particular saints, such as those in more recent history like St Seraphim of Sarov and St Jean Vianney (StJohn Vianney) of France, as well as the Indian saint Sri Ramakrishna and also of St Vincent De Paul and St Francis of Assisi. Mouni Sadhu's devotion to Christ and his unwavering commitment as a Christian, can be summed by his description of Christ as the Master of Masters, an expression he said was used by both Sri Maharshi and P. Sedir. This attitude pervades all of his works. In addition, all his books clearly express the fact that the contemporary spiritual Master, Ramana Maharshi, unquestionably never advised any conversion from one religion to another, but rather a conversion from Ignorance to Wisdom. The final and culminating book in the 'Mystic Trilogy', Samadhi, has the dedication, 'To the Light which illumines every man who comes into the World'.

Bibliography
Quem Sou Eu? (Who am I?) – 1948
In Days of Great Peace – at the Feet of Sri Ramana Maharshi – Diary Leaves from India –  first published in 1952, printed by Ramnarayan Press, Bangalore, India
In Days of Great Peace – the Highest Yoga as Lived – 2nd ed. revised and enlarged – 1957 by George Allen and Unwin
Concentration – A Guide to Mental Mastery – 1959 (USA) edition published by Harper and Brothers, New York or published in Great Britain as Concentration-An Outline for Practical Study – 1959 by George Allen and Unwin
Ways to Self-Realization – A Modern Evaluation of Occultism and Spiritual Paths – 1962 in the US by The Julian Press and in 1963 in Great Britain by George Allen and Unwin
Samadhi – The Superconsciousness of the Future – 1962
The Tarot – A Contemporary Course on the Quintessence of Hermetic Occultism – 1962
Theurgy – The Art of Effective Worship – 1965
Meditation – An Outline for Practical Study – 1967
Initiations by Paul Sedir; translated from the French by Mouni Sadhu. – 1967

References

External links
http://www.mounisadhu.com/
What Is Meditation by Mouni Sadhu
https://www.facebook.com/groups/36502808827/?ref=ts&fref=ts

1897 births
1971 deaths
Australian people of Polish descent
Australian spiritual writers
Tarot readers
Tarotologists